Elliot James Hanson (born 12 February 1994) is a British professional sailor and Olympian.

He qualified Great Britain to compete in the Laser class at the 2020 Summer Olympics in Tokyo. He went on to represent Great Britain finishing 12th competing in the Laser class.  In 2020 he won the Laser European Championships

In 2008 he won the Topper Class World Championship and in 2022 he also won the 5.5 Metre World Championship where he was initial scheduled to crew but he ended up helming.

Hanson is currently ranked 12th in the ILCA 7 men's rankings, as well as being ranked 1st ILCA 7 sailor from Great Britain.

References

External links
 
 
 

 

1994 births
Living people
British male sailors (sport)
Olympic sailors of Great Britain
Sailors at the 2020 Summer Olympics – Laser
Sportspeople from Macclesfield
World champions in sailing for Great Britain
5.5 Metre class world champions
Topper (dinghy) class world champions